Ksar Hadada, sometimes known as Ksar Hedada, is a village in southeastern Tunisia. Star Wars: Episode I – The Phantom Menace was filmed here. The population at the 2004 census was 1298, and 1142 in 2014.

Geography 
Ksar Hadada is surrounded by a mountain range. The village is also home to a valley between 25 and 50 meters deep called Gattar.

Several fossils have been found in and around the village.

Climate
The climate is semi-arid, as the Sahara is only fifty kilometers away, and rain is rare but abundant when it does occur. Temperatures can reach 48°C during the day in summer and go down to 0°C at night in winter.

Architecture and education

A mosque was built in the 1950s. There are also two cafés, a post office, a library, a football stadium and a dozen shops.

The village has a kindergarten and a primary school. On the other hand, the ksar does not have a middle or high school, but there are relationships established to link the village with the two middle schools and two high schools of the town of Ghomrassen.

Politics

Government 
Ksar Hadada is run by a mayor and a village council. Seeing as almost all local government is located in Ghomrassen, projects concerning the village are discussed with the mayor of Ghomrassen and the town's council, and occasionally with the governor of Tataouine.

Elections

Economy 

The local economy depends mainly on olive cultivation as well as goat and sheep farming. Most of the village's residents no longer live there and only return during the holidays; this emigration is caused by a lack of employment. Ksar Hadada remains strongly tied to the nearby town of Ghomrassen, as it is the seat of the municipality.

Part of the ksar has been turned into a hotel where tourists can stay. An area was used by director George Lucas in the film Star Wars : Episode I - The Phantom Menace to represent Mos Espa on the planet Tatooine, the birthplace of Anakin Skywalker.

Famous people 
 Amira Yahyaoui (1984- ), activist and founder of the NGO Al Bawsala (daughter of Mokhtar)
 Mokhtar Yahyaoui (1952-2015), judge and human rights activist before the revolution
 Zouhair Yahyaoui (1967-2005), cyber-dissident active in favor of freedom of expression under the regime of Zine el-Abidine Ben Ali, dead following torture (cousin of Amira)

Tribute 
An onshore oil field in the south of Tunisia is named Ksar Hadada.

References

External links 
 
 Lexicorient

Geography of Tunisia